Ketchum Ridge is the largest ridge that extends east from the southern part of Endeavour Massif, Kirkwood Range, Antarctica. It was named after Captain Gerald L. Ketchum, United States Navy. Ketchum was Deputy Commander of Task Force 43 during Operation Deep Freeze I II, and III (three seasons, 1955–56 through 1957–58), in command of ships in the Ross Sea Group.

References

Ridges of Victoria Land
Scott Coast